Tiruvarur Chariot festival, known in Tamil as Tiruvarur Therottam, is a festival following the rituals and traditions associated with the Thyagaraja Swamy temple, Tiruvarur, in Tamil Nadu, India. During the festival, a representation of the Lord Veethividangar (வீதிவிடங்கர்) now called as Thiyagarajaswami (Shiva) comes out of the massive ancient temple, with his consort Kondi (கொண்டி) (Parvathi) to bless devotees while riding in one of the world's largest chariots. The chariot was constructed by Kothanars and it is Asia's biggest chariot.

Description
The chariot is known for being one of the largest of its kind in the country. The festival is one of the ancient festivals that are often mentioned in the devotional hymns of saints like (Appar, Tirugnanasambandar and Sundarar) and many Tamil literature, usually held during the summer between months of March and April every year, lasts more than 25 days. On the day of the chariot festival, the uthsava morthi (the lord who comes out for procession) is beautifully decorated and brought out of the temple along with his consort to the Great Car (Aalhi Ther [ஆழித் தேர்] in Tamil) and go for the procession all day long. This chariot is said to the biggest one of its type in size and height. Apart from this grand chariot there are 4 more cars for the lord's consort, Ganesa, Subramanya, Kamalambikai and Chandikeswarar, respectively.

Biggest in the World 
"'Kothanars' are the main craftsmen of the temple cars. Experienced and expert carpenters do the intricate wood carving of all the deities adorning the base," says scholar and historian Kudavayil Balasubramanian. 'Aalhi Ther' is the biggest temple chariot in Asia. The 30-ft tall temple car rises to 96 ft, after decoration is completed with bamboo poles and colourful cloth, the kalasam alone accounting for 6 ft, all of which take the original weight of 220 tonnes to 350. Incidentally, the massive car of Valluvar Kottam in Chennai was built on the lines of the Tiruvarur 'Aalhi Ther.'

References
4. Shakthi Vikatan https://www.youtube.com/watch?v=QHrvhK4zROs&t=32s
Hindu festivals
Tamil culture
Tiruvarur district
Animal festival or ritual
Religious festivals in India
Chariots